The river Nesque (French: La Nesque) is a river in Provence (France). It flows through Vaucluse department, between Vaucluse Mountains and plains of Comtat Venaissin.

Communes crossing 
 Aurel
 Méthamis
 Blauvac
 Malemort-du-Comtat
 Venasque
 Saint-Didier
 Pernes-les-Fontaines

References 

Rivers of Vaucluse
Rivers of France
Rivers of Provence-Alpes-Côte d'Azur